Match Day is an association football video game franchise created by Jon Ritman in 1984 for the 1980s 8-bit home computer market.

Games in the series 

The following games are part of the Match Day series. All of the games were published by Ocean, with the exception of Super Match Soccer:

 Match Day: the first game in the series. It was created in 1984 and released on most home computers of the era, but is most well known for its Sinclair Spectrum incarnation. It was designed and developed by Jon Ritman with the help of Chris Clarke.
 International Match Day is an improved version of Match Day published in 1985 for ZX Spectrum 128KB. It takes advantage of the extra memory available to provide better sound and some full screen images.
 Match Day II was released in 1987 for the Amstrad CPC, ZX Spectrum, MSX and Commodore 64 platforms. It was written by Jon Ritman, with graphics by Bernie Drummond and music and sound by Guy Stevens (Commodore version, programmed by John Darnel). The game was the first one to include complete control over ball direction, power and elevation (using a kickometer), and a brand new deflection system (Diamond Deflection System).
 Final Whistle was the name of an arcade machine very similar to Match Day 2 (it was previously called Soccerama during development). Although it was finished it was never released.
 Super Match Soccer, was released in 1998 by Acclaim. Although its working title was The Net, it was intended to be released as Match Day III (it was even presented as such in a PlayStation preview in Spain), but due to licensing problems the name was finally changed. It was developed in 1998 by Cranberry Source and published by Acclaim. The game is available for PC and PlayStation.

References

External links 
 Inept Reviews: International Match Day at youtube.com
 Match Day at worldofspectrum.org
 Match Day Challenge at Crash on-line #37
 International Match Day at ysrnry.co.uk
 Match Day II at Mobygames.com
 Super Match Soccer review at Computerandvideogames.com

Association football video games
Ocean Software games
1984 video games
1987 video games
1998 video games
Amstrad CPC games
ZX Spectrum games
Commodore 64 games
MSX games
BBC Micro and Acorn Electron games
Windows games
PlayStation (console) games
Video game franchises introduced in 1984
Video games developed in the United Kingdom